The following is an alphabetical index of articles related to graphonomics. Most pages are generic and may not include any graphonomics material.

  
 
 
 
 
 
 
  script
 
 
 
  
 
 
  (in handwriting) 
 
 
 
 
 
 
 
 
 
 
  (when not composition of text, see Writing)
 
 
 
 
 
 Movement parameter in handwriting

.
 
 
  (handwriting)
 
 

 
 
 
 
 
 
 
  (See also )
 
 
 
 
 
 
 
  

 
 
 
  (also known as 'Body size' and 'Corpus size')

Penmanship